Showoffs is an American television game show which ran on ABC from June 30 to December 26, 1975. Bobby Van was host, with Gene Wood as announcer. The Mark Goodson-Bill Todman production involved two teams competing in a game of charades.

Gameplay
Two teams of three players competed. The teams were composed of two celebrity guests and one civilian contestant. One team wore red sweaters and the other blue over their street clothes.

Because the team colors were indistinguishable on monochrome-only television sets (which were still somewhat common in 1975), the words "REDS" and "BLUES" were later printed on the front of each team member's sweater for the benefit of home viewers.

Format #1
One team was isolated while two members of the other team acted out a series of words to their partner for sixty seconds. The actors could alternate in acting, and the guessing partner could pass on a word if he or she got stuck, but he or she could do that only once per turn. When time ran out, the isolated team returned to the stage, and acted out the same words as the first team. The team that guessed the most words in their own minute won the round, and the first team to win two rounds won the game.

If a round ended in a tie, a tiebreaker round was played in which both teams had 30 seconds to act out three words. The team doing that in the fastest time won.

Format #2
Towards the end of the show's run, the method to win the game had changed. In this format, a team had to correctly convey and guess seven words or more to win the game.

Extra rounds were played if the goal had not been reached by the end of a full round, and the tiebreaker was cut to two words in 30 seconds.

Either way, the contestant on the winning team won a $1,000 prize package plus a chance to play the Payoff Round.

Payoff Round

Format #1
All four celebrities alternated turns acting out a series of words for the winning contestant to guess during the next 60 seconds during the first round, with each correct answer worth $1. When time ran out, one celebrity chosen by the contestant had 30 seconds to act out three words during the second round.

Each word added a zero to the winning player's round one winnings. Guessing one word correctly was worth 10 times the money, two words 100 times, and all three 1,000 times the money earned in the first phase. As much as $10,000 could be won in this format.

Format #2
About the time when the front game changed, the bonus round was also revised. Now the winning contestant acted out a maximum of three words to one of his or her two celebrity partners. He or she acted out the first two words for 10 seconds each with those words worth $1,000 each.

The contestant could choose to stop after either of the two were guessed or risk his or her earnings to that point and continue. On the third and final word (usually more difficult than the first two), the contestant acted it out for 15 seconds and if the celebrity partner guessed it, the contestant won $3,000 more, for a total of $5,000.

If at any point the celebrity partners failed to guess a word correctly when time ran out, the contestant lost half of his or money earned up to that point and the game ended.

Regardless of either format, the champion switched teams and competed against the next contestant, unless he or she was beaten or had accumulated at least $20,000 in total winnings.

Sounds
The sound effects used on Showoffs would later be employed on Goodson-Todman's Family Feud – the bell which sounded whenever a teammate guessed the word correctly became the clang for revealing answers. The dings for winning a game also were later heard on the show. The time's-up buzzer was later used as the strike buzzer.

Additionally, when a player lost the bonus round, the "Losing Horns" fanfare from The Price is Right was played.

Broadcast history

Pilot
On May 24, 1975, Larry Blyden hosted a couple pilots for Showoffs. Elaine Joyce, Ron Masak, Linda Kaye Henning, and Dick Gautier were the celebrities, and the format was the one used in the first half of the series' run.

Shortly after the pilots finished taping, Blyden went on a short vacation to Morocco. While driving to Tan-Tan, his rental car went off the road and overturned, knocking him unconscious. Doctors in an Agadir hospital were unable to contact Blyden's family for several days as Blyden had been carrying no identification.

Blyden died on June 6, just twenty-four days before the series was to premiere. Bobby Van replaced him as host when the series premiered.

Series
Goodson-Todman had very little time to react to Blyden's death (the first tapings for the series were only a few days away) and substituted Van into the hosting role. This last-minute change may have deterred potential viewers, although Van had proven himself quite popular as a panelist on Goodson-Todman's Match Game and Tattletales. Promos that had been made prior to Blyden's death (using clips from one of the pilots, as was common with soon-to-debut games) had to be edited to remove his voice and face.

Showoffs debuted on June 30, 1975 at 12:00 Noon (11:00 AM Central), replacing Password and inheriting its predecessor's ratings problems. Despite facing the much-hyped but popularly-and-critically-panned Magnificent Marble Machine on NBC, Showoffs could not make any sort of dent in CBS's hit daytime drama The Young and the Restless, which had become a top-ten show by that point.

The game finished its six-month run on the day after Christmas and bowed out in favor of the ailing Let's Make a Deal, which left its 1:30 PM (12:30 Central) slot after over 11 years on two different networks; the ABC version would be canceled six months later. A scheduling shuffle involving Rhyme and Reason made way for Regis Philbin's first shot as a game show host, The Neighbors.

Revival
Showoffs was later revived on CBS from 1984 to 1986 under the title Body Language with Tom Kennedy as host. Johnny Olson announced from the debut through his death in October 1985, after which Gene Wood (Showoffs''' announcer) and Bob Hilton announced through the end of the run.

Episode status
The series is believed to have been wiped, as per network practices of that era. Reportedly, only one episode is known to exist and is among tape traders in varied quality. Originally broadcast on November 28, guest celebrity Dr. Joyce Brothers injured herself on that episode, requiring celebrity partner Dick Gautier to do her portion of the charades alone for the final round. Karen Morrow and Mike Farrell were the other two celebrities that day.

One of Blyden's pilots is held by the UCLA Film and Television Archive; a clip was shown in VH-1's 2005 series Game Show Moments Gone Bananas. Wink Martindale's YouTube page released one of the pilots starting on January 19, 2021.

The episode broadcast on Christmas Day is also held at UCLA and was aired by Buzzr on September 25, 2021 as part of their annual Lost and Found'' marathon.

References

External links
 Showoffs on IMDb

American Broadcasting Company original programming
1970s American game shows
1975 American television series debuts
1975 American television series endings
Television series by Mark Goodson-Bill Todman Productions
Lost television shows